Llanfrothen is a hamlet and community in the county of Gwynedd, Wales, between the towns of Porthmadog and Blaenau Ffestiniog and is 108.1 miles (174.0 km) from Cardiff. In 2011 the population of Llanfrothen was 437 with 70.1% of them able to speak Welsh.

Parc, a Grade II* Listed Building is within the community, as are the village of Garreg and the hamlet of Croesor.

The church at Llanfrothen is dedicated to St Brothen and is a Grade 1 listed building and is in the care of the Friends of Friendless Churches

The church and parish achieved prominence throughout Wales in 1888 when David Lloyd George, then a young local solicitor, took a case involving burial rights in Llanfrothen churchyard on appeal to the Divisional Court of the Queen’s Bench Division.

See also
St Brothen's Church, Llanfrothen
Plas Brondanw
List of localities in Wales by population

References

External links
 http://www.garreg.gwynedd.sch.uk

 
Communities in Gwynedd